Tongwei County is located in the middle of Gansu province, the People's Republic of China, with east longitude between 104°57' and north latitude between 34°55' and 35°29'. It is under the administration of the prefecture-level city of Dingxi. Its postal code is 743300. The total population at the end of 2009 was 458 thousand, including agricultural population of 405.8 thousand which accounts for 88.6% of the total population, and the total number of households were 110.1 thousand, including 87.5 thousand rural households that account for 79.47% of the total households. Tongwei County is thus an area that is predominant on agriculture. Due to the loess landscape with steep gullies, the roads and rural settlement layout is very unevenly distributed.

History
According to archaeological findings, people inhabited in Tongwei county four to five thousand years ago. Pottery of Yuanyu culture and Qijia culture has been found in Tongwei. The area has been an administrative county since the 3rd year of Yuanding (元鼎三年, 113 BC).

Tongwei county was formally created in fifth year of Congning era, Northern Song dynasty (1106 AD). It suffered extensive damage and saw 73,000 deaths during the 1718 Tongwei–Gansu earthquake.

During  Great Chinese Famine, at least 80,000 people died from famine.

Administrative divisions
Tongwei is divided in 14 towns and 4 townships.
Towns

Townships

Climate

Economy
Up to 1000MW of wind energy capacity is installed in the county. Natural resources include geothermal (hot springs), granite, marble, andesite, ferrite and kaolin.

The county has a grain output of 1.2 million tonnes as well as growing significant amounts of corn, potato, other grains and fruit trees. Recently, Tongwei has become the largest grower of honeysuckle for traditional medicine.

The county's GDP was 1,441 billion, and 3146.86 yuan per capita, rural per capita net income was 2259.27 yuan, the two are all lower than the average of the entire province, and the economic development is relatively backward.

It is one of the 18 drought counties, 23 provincial 'deep poverty counties', and 41 national help-the-poor counties. As of 2017, 17.% of the population still lived in poverty.

See also
 List of administrative divisions of Gansu

References

  Official website (Chinese)

 
County-level divisions of Gansu
Dingxi